Stigmella allophylica is a moth of the family Nepticulidae. It was described by Scoble in 1978. It is found in South Africa (it was described from the Umhlanga Rocks in Natal).

The larvae feed on Allophylus natalensis. They probably mine the leaves of their host.

References

Endemic moths of South Africa
Nepticulidae
Moths of Africa
Moths described in 1978